Hibbertia intermedia is a species of flowering plant in the family Dilleniaceae and is endemic to New South Wales. It is a small shrublet with linear to narrow oblong leaves and yellow flowers usually with seven to nine stamens arranged in a single cluster.

Description
There are seven to nine stamens in a single cluster on one side of the two hairy carpels, each carpel with two to four ovules. Flowering occurs from November to March.

Taxonomy
This species was described in 1817 by Augustin Pyramus de Candolle who gave it the name Pleurandra intermedia in his Regni Vegetabilis Systema Naturale. In 2012 Hellmut R. Toelken changed the name to Hibbertia intermedia in the Journal of the Adelaide Botanic Gardens.

Distribution and habitat
Hibbertia intermedia usually grows on west slopes in heath, scub or woodland on the Central Tablelands and Central Coast of New South Wales.

References

intermedia
Flora of New South Wales
Taxa named by Augustin Pyramus de Candolle
Plants described in 1817